Wales is one of six countries to have competed in every Commonwealth Games since 1930, the others being Australia, Canada, England, New Zealand and Scotland. At the Commonwealth Games, Wales takes part as a separate entity, as in the Six Nations Rugby Championship, Rugby World Cup and international association football competitions. In other events, such as the Olympic Games, they compete under the banner of the United Kingdom.

Commonwealth Games Wales (formerly the 'Commonwealth Games Council for Wales'),  manages the team's entry to the games and supports Welsh athletes in their participation.

Wales has hosted one Commonwealth Games to date, the 1958 British Empire and Commonwealth Games in Cardiff.

Overall medals tally
After the 2014 Commonwealth Games, Wales was tenth in the All-time tally of medals, with an overall total of 270 medals (57 gold, 86 silver and 127 bronze).

The most gold medals that Wales have won in a Commonwealth Games is 10, at the 1990 Commonwealth Games in Auckland. The largest medal haul was at the 2014 Commonwealth Games in Glasgow, at which Wales won 36 medals including five gold. Both records were equalled at the 2018 Commonwealth Games.

Flag and victory anthem

Team Wales uses the Welsh national flag, Y Ddraig Goch, at the Commonwealth Games. This flag is common for all sporting teams that represent Wales as an entity distinct from the United Kingdom.

The Welsh national anthem Hen Wlad Fy Nhadau ("Land of My Fathers") is used as the Welsh victory anthem at the Commonwealth games.

References

External links
Team Wales (Commonwealth Games Wales)

 

 
Nations at the Commonwealth Games